Indiana University Health Ball Memorial Hospital is an academic teaching hospital in the city of Muncie, Indiana. It is the only hospital in the city of Muncie, Indiana. It was founded by the Ball Brothers, hence the name, Ball Memorial Hospital. It is near the campus of Ball State University; however, it is affiliated with the Indiana University School of Medicine. The hospital was founded in 1929. It houses 3 residency programs/graduate medical education program including internal medicine, family medicine and a transitional year residency.

References

External links
 
 Ball Memorial Hospital Records—Archives and Special Collections, Ball State University Libraries (PDF)
 Ball Memorial Hospital Auxiliary Records—Archives and Special Collections, Ball State University Libraries (PDF)

1929 establishments in Indiana
Ball Corporation
Buildings and structures in Muncie, Indiana
Hospitals established in 1929
Hospitals in Indiana
Trauma centers